Ethanur is a village which is situated at southern side of Palakkad (12 km).

References

Villages in Palakkad district